Yulia Putintseva was the defending champion, having won the event in 2012, but chose not to defend her title.

Wild card Caroline Garcia won the title, defeating lucky loser Maryna Zanevska in the final, 6–0, 4–6, 6–3.

Seeds

Main draw

Finals

Top half

Bottom half

References 
 Main draw

Open GDF Suez de Cagnes-sur-Mer Alpes-Maritimes - Singles